Jerome Kern is a compilation album of phonograph records by Bing Crosby of songs written by Jerome Kern.

Track listings

Original release
These songs were featured on a 4-disc, 78 rpm album set, Decca Album No. A-485.
 Disc 1 (23678): "Till the Clouds Roll By" / "Ol' Man River"
 Disc 2 (23679): "I've Told Ev'ry Little Star" / "Dearly Beloved"
 Disc 3 (23680): "Long Ago (and Far Away)" / "All Through the Day"
 Disc 4 (23681): "A Fine Romance" / "The Way You Look Tonight"

LP reissue
The 1949 10" LP album issue Decca DL 5001 consisted of eight songs on one 33 1/3 rpm record. All were reissues of earlier recordings.

References

Bing Crosby compilation albums
1946 compilation albums
Decca Records compilation albums
Jerome Kern tribute albums